Methanofurans are a family of chemical compounds found in methanogenic archaea.  These species feature a 2-aminomethylfuran linked to phenoxy group.  At least three different end groups are recognized: R = tricarboxyheptanoyl (methanofuran), glutamyl-glutamyl (methanofuran b), tricarboxy-2-hydroxyheptanoyl (methanofuran c, see picture).

Formylation of MFR
Methanofuran converts to formylmethanofuran in an early stage of methanogenesis.  
The enzyme formylmethanofuran dehydrogenase (EC: 1.2.99.5) formylates methanofuran using , the primary C1 source in methanogenesis.

Deformylation of MFR
The enzyme formylmethanofuran:tetrahydromethanopterin formyltransferase catalyzes the transfer of the formyl group from formylmethanofuran to N5 on tetrahydromethanopterin, .  This enzyme has been crystallized; it contains no prosthetic group.

References

Amines
Peptides
Coenzymes